Donald Paul Hodel (born May 23, 1935) is an American former politician who served as United States Secretary of Energy and Secretary of the Interior. He was known during his tenure as Secretary of the Interior for his controversial "Hodel Policy," which stated that disused dirt roads and footpaths could be considered right-of-ways under RS 2477.

Hodel proposed that rather than reduce the production of CFCs to prevent ozone layer destruction, people should wear hats and use sunscreen. His plan was assailed by scientists and environmentalists, who pointed out the "broad and potentially disastrous effects that increased ultraviolet radiation would have on the Earth’s climate, food chains and individual species of plants and animals other than humans". Critics of Hodel’s "Ray-Ban Plan" sarcastically depicted animals and plants wearing sunglasses to protect against increased radiation, and called for his resignation.

Early life
Hodel was born in Portland, Oregon, the son of Philip E. Hodel and Theresia R. Brodt. He attended Harvard University. In 1957 he married Barbara Beecher Stockman, who was born in Pittsburgh, Pennsylvania, and attended Wellesley College. She married Hodel during her senior year.

They moved to Oregon after graduation and Hodel earned his J.D. at the University of Oregon. While living in Oregon, the Hodels had two sons, and Barbara became a full-time mother.

After their elder son's suicide, the Hodels became evangelical Christians. They became active in church and other Christian ministries and began speaking at evangelical meetings and prayer breakfasts. The Hodels have appeared on The 700 Club with Pat Robertson, The Hour of Power with Robert Schuller and on Focus on the Family broadcasts with James Dobson, encouraging families that have also lost loved ones to suicide.

Government career
From 1972 to 1977, Hodel was the administrator of the Bonneville Power Administration. After leaving it, he said that the Pacific Northwest would eventually need all the power that would be produced by the nuclear power plants proposed by the Washington Public Power Supply System.

Hodel served as United States Secretary of Energy from 1982 to 1985 and Secretary of the Interior from 1985 to 1989 under President Ronald Reagan. He had been Undersecretary of the Interior under James Watt.

Critics disrupted his efforts to impose a new management policy on a large amount of federal land and blocked his efforts to create vast new wilderness areas. In spite of the criticisms, the Reagan administration added over two million acres (8,000 km²) to the national wilderness system. The Hodel policy was continued under Manuel Lujan Jr. in the George H. W. Bush administration. It was rescinded in 1997 by Secretary Bruce Babbitt.

In an article, Hodel wrote, "Throughout President Reagan's eight years, his secretaries of the Interior pursued these objectives within the framework of his and their conviction that America could have both an improving environment and an adequate energy supply. We did not and do not have to choose between them, as some have contended."

While secretary, Hodel proposed to undertake a study on the removal of the O'Shaughnessy Dam in Yosemite National Park, and the restoration of Hetch Hetchy Valley, a smaller but inundated version of Yosemite Valley. Dianne Feinstein, former mayor of San Francisco, which owns the dam, opposed the study and had it quashed.

In March 1984, the Navajo Nation requested that Secretary of the Interior William Clark make a reasonable adjustment of the coal lease royalty rate paid by Peabody Coal, now Peabody Energy. In July 1985, the newly appointed Hodel secretly met ex parte with Peabody's representative, "a former aide and friend of Secretary Hodel". After briefly reviewing the proposals' merits, Hodel approved lease amendments with royalty rates well below the rate that had previously been determined appropriate by the agencies responsible for monitoring the federal government's relations with Native Americans. In 2007, the US Court of Appeals for the Federal Circuit determined that those actions breached the government's duty of trust to the Nation and established a "cognizable money-mandating claim" against the government under the Indian Tucker Act.

Post-government career
Hodel moved to Colorado, where he engaged in the energy consulting business and served on various charitable and corporate boards of directors. He is the author of Crisis in the Oil Patch (Regnery, 1995).

From June 1997 to February 1999, Hodel served as president of the Christian Coalition, a nonprofit conservative political group founded by religious broadcaster Pat Robertson.

From May 2003 to March 2005, Hodel served as president and CEO of Focus on the Family, a nonprofit evangelical Christian organization. He said his job was to manage the transition from the founder, James Dobson, to his successor. Several years before being named president, Hodel had served on its board, and he remained on the board until October 2005.

Hodel was also chairman of the company FreeEats.com, which has disseminated push polls for the Economic Freedom Fund.

Environmental efforts 
As Secretary of the Interior, in 1985 Hodel ordered the acquisition of a ranch in southern Arizona that became the Buenos Aires National Wildlife Refuge. This refuge contains the United States' only population of the masked bobwhite quail.

, Hodel serves as chairman and senior vice president for strategy and policy at Summit Power Group, Inc., a Seattle-based developer of wind, solar and gas-fired power plants. In 1989, he was the founder and managing director of Summit's predecessor company.

References

External links
 

|-

1935 births
Living people
Harvard University alumni
University of Oregon School of Law alumni
United States Secretaries of Energy
United States Secretaries of the Interior
Reagan administration cabinet members
20th-century American politicians
American Lutherans
Lawyers from Portland, Oregon
Grant High School (Portland, Oregon) alumni
Oregon Republicans
Christians from Colorado
Focus on the Family people